is a Japanese beverage company, manufactured and marketed by , headquartered in Higashisumiyoshi-ku, Osaka, Japan.

Most Sangaria soft drinks are infused with vitamins and marketed for their health benefits.

The company is famous for the slogan , a play on "1, 2, 3!" ("Ichi, Ni, San!").

The company name originates from the Chinese poem Spring View (春望, Ch: Chūn Wàng, Jpn: Shumbō) by Du Fu (杜甫). Included is the phrase, "The country (or its capital Chang'an) has collapsed, but there are still mountains and rivers." (Chinese:「國破山河在」, Gúo pò shān hé zài, Japanese:「国破れて山河在り」, Kuni yaburete sanga ari). The words 山河在り mean that the mountains and rivers (still) exist.

Products
 Ikkyu Jaya Series
 genmaicha
 green tea
 oolong tea
 Milk coffee
 Miracle Body V
 Ramuné
 Royal Milk Tea
 Sangaria Original Coffee
 Tochu-cha
 Strawberry Milk

References

External links
 Japan Sangaria Website
 Sangaria USA Website

Drink companies of Japan
Japanese drinks
Companies based in Osaka Prefecture